Pascal Cagni (born October 28, 1961) is a French business executive who has worked for electronics company Apple Inc. and French government agency Business France.

Biography 
Pascal Cagni was born in Cernay (Haut-Rhin), France on October 28, 1961.

In 2000, Cagni was hired as general manager and vice-president of Apple's Europe, Middle East and Africa division.

Between 2015 and 2017, Cagni was on the board of Style.com.

In 2017, Cagni was appointed to the Chairperson of Business France and France Ambassador to international investments. He has spoken in support of closer economic links with Italy.

References 

French businesspeople

Living people
1961 births
People from Haut-Rhin
Sciences Po alumni
University of Strasbourg alumni
Recipients of the Legion of Honour
Knights of the Ordre national du Mérite